Bodri is a town and a nagar panchayat in Bilaspur district  in the state of Chhattisgarh, India.

Demographics
 India census, Bodri had a population of 17,481. Males constitute 50.69% of the population and females 49.31%, that is the sex ratio of 973 females for every 1000 males. Bodri has an average literacy rate of 77.74%, higher than the national average of 59.5%; with male literacy of 86.55% and female literacy of 68.71%. 14.15% of the population is under 6 years of age.

References

Cities and towns in Bilaspur district, Chhattisgarh